William of Waddington was an Anglo-Norman poet of the thirteenth century, best known as the author of Manuel des pechiez. He may have been a priest at Rydal.

The Manuel des pechiez ("Manual of the Sins") is a didactic poem, written between 1250 and 1270, containing 1200 octosyllabic rhyming lines that combine practical moral education for lay people with elements of confession. It was the source for Robert Mannyng's better-known Handlyng Synne (1303). Waddington in turn interpolates lines from Nicholas Bozon's "Gospel Poem".

References

 Émile-Jules-François Arnould,  Le Manuel des péchés, étude de littérature religieuse anglo-normande, XIIIe siècle, Paris, Droz, 1940
 Gaston Paris, Wilham de Wadington, auteur du Manuel des péchés. Macé de la Charité, auteur d'une Bible en vers français, Paris, Impr. nationale, 1881

British writers in French
13th-century poets
Anglo-Norman literature